The 1985–86 season was the team's 60th season, their 54th season as the Red Wings. This was the first of two seasons in which Red Wings games would air in the Detroit area on then-independent WXON-TV (now MyNetworkTV affiliate WMYD) channel 20 before returning to WKBD channel 50 (then a Fox station, now with The CW) for the 1987–88 season after the two-year break. It was also the first of 11 seasons with former NBC sportscaster Dave Strader as the Red Wings' television play-by-play announcer, joining him as color commentator was former Red Wings right wing man Mickey Redmond. Also, the Red Wings played their first game with Hall of Famer Brad Park as their head coach on December 31, 1985. This was Park's only season as a head coach in the NHL, replacing former Hockey Night in Canada, Toronto Maple Leafs, and Buffalo Sabres radio and TV color commentator Harry Neale, who was fired after 35 games. Park had retired as a player during the previous season. The Red Wings finished dead last in the Norris Division, the Clarence Campbell Conference, and in the entire National Hockey League with a record of 17 wins, 57 losses and 6 ties, for a total of 40 points, failing to make the playoffs. It is the worst record in franchise history; they finished the season with the fewest goals scored of all NHL teams, the most goals against, and the most penalty minutes.

Offseason

Regular season

Final standings

Schedule and results

Playoffs

Player statistics

Regular season
Scoring

Goaltending

Note: GP = Games played; G = Goals; A = Assists; Pts = Points; +/- = Plus-minus PIM = Penalty minutes; PPG = Power-play goals; SHG = Short-handed goals; GWG = Game-winning goals;
      MIN = Minutes played; W = Wins; L = Losses; T = Ties; GA = Goals against; GAA = Goals-against average;  SO = Shutouts; SA=Shots against; SV=Shots saved; SV% = Save percentage;

Awards and records

This team set the NHL record for most fighting majors in a season with 154.

Transactions

Draft picks
Detroit's draft picks at the 1985 NHL Entry Draft held at the Metro Toronto Convention Centre in Toronto, Ontario.

Farm teams

See also
1985–86 NHL season

References

External links

Detroit Red Wings seasons
Detroit
Detroit
Detroit Red
Detroit Red